The Winter Haven Super Sox were one of the eight original franchises that began play in the Senior Professional Baseball Association in 1989.  The club, playing in the spring training site of the Boston Red Sox, featured numerous former Red Sox players, including future Hall of Famer Ferguson Jenkins as part of its pitching staff.  

In the league's inaugural season, the Super Sox struggled and went through several managerial changes.  Player/manager Bill Lee was replaced after just seven games by Ed Nottle, who was in turn replaced by Leon Roberts. Besides, Doug Griffin served as a coach and Dalton Jones played and coached. Among others, Cecil Cooper retired after just 16 games with the club.

The club finished in last place in the Northern Division and did not make the playoffs.  Despite the team's poor performance, pitcher Bill Campbell led the league with a 2.12 ERA. After their first season, the Winter Haven Super Sox ceased operations.

Notable players

Matt Alexander 
Gary Allenson
Jim Bibby
Mark Bomback
Pedro Borbón
Bucky Brandon
Al Bumbry 
Bill Campbell
Bernie Carbo 
Cecil Cooper
Mike Cuellar
Ron Dunn 
Mario Guerrero 
Butch Hobson 
Ferguson Jenkins
Dalton Jones 
Pete LaCock 
John LaRose
Bill Lee
Tom McMillan 
Ed Nottle
Ben Oglivie 
Joe Pittman
Gene Richards 
Leon Roberts
Tony Scott
Scipio Spinks
Jim Willoughby
Rick Wise

Source:

Sources

Senior Professional Baseball Association teams
Winter Haven, Florida
Defunct baseball teams in Florida